The Chinese Pavilion, located in the grounds of the Drottningholm Palace park, is a Chinese-inspired royal pavilion originally built between 1753 and 1769. The pavilion is currently one of Sweden's Royal Palaces and a UNESCO World Heritage Site.

The first building 

The first building was a simple pavilion with two wings in Chinese style. The buildings were prefabricated at Arsenalsgatan in Stockholm. They were made in the log cabin technique and shipped to Drottningholm, where they were assembled. The architects were probably Carl Hårleman and Carl Johan Cronstedt. Everything was finished and in place in time for Queen Lovisa Ulrika's birthday on 24July 1753. The pavilion was a surprise gift to the Queen from King Adolf Frederick. At the presentation, she received the gold key to the castle from the young Crown Prince Gustav (later King Gustav III), seven years old, dressed as a Chinese mandarin.

In a letter to her mother, Queen Sophia Dorothea of Prussia, the Queen wrote:

Having been built in haste and secrecy, the small castle did not endure the harsh Swedish climate. After ten years, rot had begun to attack the wooden frame and the king and queen commissioned Carl Fredrik Adelcrantz to create a new and bigger pavilion made from more durable materials.

The second building 

The second and current structure replaced the old wooden pavilion from 1753. Designed by Carl Fredrik Adelcrantz, construction began in 1763 and was completed in 1769.

Interior 
The royal court's chief supervisor, Jean Eric Rehn, led the interior design work. The architecture is essentially rococo and was intended to have an exotic character, containing Chinese elements, which were considered the height of fashion at the time.

The rooms of the Pavilion are full of luxury items brought to Sweden from China by the Swedish East India Company: porcelain, silk, lacquers, etc. China had become a mythic land, a paradise, a fascination, to Swedes and every nobleman wanted to have a Chinese room or just some objects to get a glimpse of this fabled, but to Europeans, forbidden land.

The walls in the Yellow Room are covered with Chinese lacquered panels, at the time a fascinating technique since no parallel craft existed in Europe. The panels depict relations between Asia and Europe in the 1700s. The motifs are scenes from Canton (now known as Guangzhou) by the Pearl River and the European Thirteen Factories separated from the city by double walls.

Exterior and garden 
The wings are connected to the main building by a series of curved rooms. Lacquer-red walls used for the facade and the sculptural ornamentation show good knowledge of Chinese buildings, but the structure of the building is characterized as clearly European. The interior is among the foremost in Swedish Rococo design.

There are four houses, also in Chinese style, just north of the pavilion. The east one, northeast of the pavilion, is called The Billiard. It used to house a billiard table which is now gone. Instead, two of King Adolf Fredericks lathes are on display together with tools from the lathe chamber. The house to the west, northwest of the pavilion, is known as The Silver Chamber.

A bit further north, resting on a high base, is the Adolf Frederick's Studio (to the right) and the Confidence (to the left). The Confidence is a dining room building where the tables (dining and serving table) are fixed on a lift device. The tables were set on the floor below the royal dining room and on a given signal they were hoisted up through the floor. This meant that the royals could eat their dinner without the presence of servants, en confidence (French for "in confidence"). North of The Confidence is the old kitchen.  it houses a café in the summers. In the park east of the Chinese Pavilion is a pagoda-like gazebo called The Volière (French for aviary).

The Pavilion underwent exterior renovations in 1927–1928, 1943–1955 and an interior in 1959–1968. Another thorough restoration of the exterior was made in 1989–1996.

The Chinese pagoda 

During the reign of King Gustav III, plans were made for a Chinese pagoda on the Flora Hill just east of the Chinese Pavilion. The project, as with most of King's ideas for buildings within the English garden, were never realized because of the assassination of the King. All the elements necessary for a royal English style pleasure garden were already present in 1781, when Fredrik Magnus Piper drew up the plans for the park. These included streams, bridges, knolls, sloping lawns (French: pelouse) and several small pavilions and gazebos in different styles.

In Piper's 1797 land use plan, one extension to the north was to contain a cave with canals and cascades, a small lake with bridges and walking paths, and a Turkish pavilion. To the east of the Chinese Pavilion at Flora Hill a Chinese pagoda would act as a connecting pont de vue (endpoint in a line of sight) between the Chinese quarter and the English Garden across Tessin's strict Baroque garden.

Burglary 

On 6August 2010, at 2:00 am, burglars broke into the Chinese Pavilion via the double doors at the back of the house. Once inside, they broke three showcases and stole a number of objects. The alarm system worked but the entire burglary took just six minutes. The collection at the Chinese Pavilion consists of, among other things, Chinese clay figurines, porcelain dolls, urns, lacquer furniture and other art pieces from China dating to 1753. The Royal Court have confirmed that the permanent state collection was on display at the time of the break-in. The pieces are considered priceless. The thieves fled from the pavilion on a moped which was found by the Mälaren lake. The police suspected that the thieves left by boat and that the robbery had been specially commissioned. It was the first time the Chinese Pavilion had been burgled.

The stolen objects were: a small Japanese lacquered box on a stand, a sculpture in green soapstone, a red lacquered chalice with a lid, a chalice carved from a rhinoceros horn, a small blackened, bronze teapot and a plate made of musk wood. Several other pieces were damaged during the break-in. Detailed descriptions and photos of the stolen items can be found at the referenced link. , none of the stolen objects has been recovered and no arrests have been made.

Kantongatan 

, ("Canton Street") is a street that marks the southwest border of the Drottningholm Palace park and starts on the shore of Lake Mälaren. The street and its houses were established by Queen Lovisa Ulrika and King Adolf Frederick as a small factory community called Kanton. Manufacturers of fine forging, lace-making and silk weaving worked here. Mulberry trees were planted for silkworm breeding, but the climate was too cold and the project only lasted about ten years. At the south end of the street is a house called Lilla Kina ("Little China"). It was built at the same time as the first Pavilion in 1753. It has been used for various things over the years, at one time being the home of Anna Sophia Hagman, official royal mistress to Prince Frederick Adolf of Sweden.

The Kanton community is also considered one of the models for the Swedish garden city. , all the houses are used as private housing.

UNESCO World Heritage Site 

The Chinese Pavilion was one of the main reasons the Drottningholm Palace was added as a UNESCO World Heritage Site in 1991. The UNESCO comments were:

Gallery

Exterior

Details on the facade

Interior

References

Bibliography

Further reading

External links 

Page on the Chinese Pavilion at the Swedish Royal palaces website
Page about the Chinese Pavilion at the National Property Board of Sweden in English 

Crown palaces in Sweden
World Heritage Sites in Sweden
Drottningholm Palace
Houses completed in 1753
Houses completed in 1769
Buildings and structures in Stockholm County
Museums in Stockholm County
Historic house museums in Sweden
Pavilion Drottningholm
Chinoiserie